The Tel Aviv Session is the first album by The Touré-Raichel Collective, a collaboration between Vieux Farka Touré from Mali and Idan Raichel from Israel. The project includes Israeli bassist Yossi Fine and Malian calabash player Souleymane Kane. It was released on 27 March 2012 on Cumbancha records.
The album features contributions from Yankale Segal, Frédéric Yonnet, Cabra Casay, and Mark Eliyahu.

Track listing
 "Azawade" 08:12
 "Bamba" 05:59
 "Experience" 06:21
 "Alkataou" 05:03
 "Hawa" 07:00
 "Kfar" (feat. Yankale Segal) 04:26
 "Touré" (feat. Frédéric Yonnet) 04:06
 "Le Niger" 07:59
 "Ai Houde Bakoi" 02:47
 "Ane Nahatka" (feat. Cabra Casay) 03:38
 "Alem" (feat. Mark Eliyahu) 08:15

References

2012 debut albums
Idan Raichel albums